The  is a cable-stayed bridge in Kobe, Japan, which opened in 1992. It has a main span of 485 meters and spans a waterway between to Artificial islands part of the Kobe-Osaka bay. The bridge is a part of the Hanshin Expressway, which also is cradled by the Tempozan Higashi Bridge, downstream of the Higashi Kobe Bridge. The bridge is also a part of the Bayshore route 5 expressway of Kobe, which is also a part of the Industrial Ring Road of Kobe. The bridge carries two decks of roadway (3 lanes on each deck) (6 in total), and the bridge is 168 meters high and the maximum clearance is 32 meters to the water. The bridge was built by the Hanshin Expressway Public Corporation.

See also
List of longest cable-stayed bridge spans

Road bridges in Japan
Buildings and structures in Kobe
Roads in Hyōgo Prefecture